Ratchanok Intanon (born 5 February 1995) is a Thai badminton player who became the first Thai to become No.1 in women's singles. She is known for her relaxed hitting motion and light footwork, which has been described as 'balletic' by commentators such as Gillian Clark. She became the world champion in women's singles in 2013.

Career

2008–2010 
In 2008, Intanon entered the international circuit at the age of 13. The first international tournament she played was the Laos International series, in which she played both singles and doubles. She lost the singles final to Vietnam's Lê Ngọc Nguyên Nhung. Intanon won her first individual international title in 2009 by winning the Vietnam International Challenge when she was 14. She made history by becoming the youngest-ever champion at the 2009 BWF World Junior Championships at 14 in Malaysia by beating her compatriot Porntip Buranaprasertsuk. She reached the final of the Malaysia International Challenge 2009, losing out to Sapsiree Taerattanachai. She also reached the 2009 Southeast Asian Games women's singles final, but lost to her compatriot Salakjit Ponsana.

In 2010, at the age of 15, she successfully defended her title at the 2010 BWF World Junior Championships in Mexico by beating Misaki Matsutomo. Her successful run continued after she won Smiling Fish International Event, beating teammate Rawinda Prajongjai. She won back-to-back Grand Prix tournaments by winning the Vietnam Open Grand Prix beating China's Zhou Hui and the Indonesia Grand Prix Gold after defeating Cheng Shao-chieh from Chinese Taipei. In the 2010 Guangzhou Asian Games, she won a silver medal as a member of the women's team. In the final, she lost to Wang Xin, at that time world number 1.

2011–2012 
Intanon participated in BWF World Championships and lost in the third round to eventual winner Wang Yihan. She was a finalist at the Chinese Taipei Open, where she was defeated by Sung Ji-hyun. She became the most successful player ever in individual events at the BWF World Junior Championships, winning the women's singles title for the third straight time by defeating Indonesia's Elyzabeth Purwaningtyas. She won the India Open Grand Prix Gold where she received a walkover against Porntip Buranaprasertsuk in final. She was also a member of the women's team that defeated Indonesia in the final of the 2011 Southeast Asian Games. She herself was a bronze medalist in singles event, where she lost in the semifinals to Singapore's Fu Mingtian.

In 2012, Intanon, at 16 years of age, was awarded the Best Female Athlete Award in Thailand after winning the world junior title for three successive years. She reached the finals of the Thailand Open but lost to Saina Nehwal. After defeating the higher-seeded Juliane Schenk of Germany in round of 16, she reached the quarterfinals of the 2012 Olympic Games where she lost to second seed Wang Xin despite leading 21–17 and 16–9 in the second game. She entered the finals of a Super Series tournament for the first time in the China Open but lost to Li Xuerui 12–21, 9–21. She qualified for the 2012 BWF Super Series Finals and won all of her group matches in straight games against Juliane Schenk, Tine Baun and Saina Nehwal. She lost in the semifinals there to Wang Shixian. She finished the year as world number 9.

2013 
Intanon reached the finals of the All England Open, losing to Tine Rasmussen 14–21, 21–16, 10–21. She is the youngest ever singles finalist at the All England Open. She lost in the final of the Swiss Open Grand Prix Gold after being defeated by Wang Shixian. She won her first Superseries tournament by beating Juliane Schenk 22–20, 21–14 in the India Open to become the youngest-ever Superseries winner at the age of 18 years, 2 months and 22 days (she held this record for 6 months until Akane Yamaguchi won the 2013 Japan Super Series at the age of 16). She again reached the finals of the Thailand Open, winning the title after beating Busanan Ongbamrungphan to become the first Thai ever to win the women's singles title at the Thailand Open since it was first held in 1984.

Intanon withdrew from both the Indonesia Open SSP and Singapore Open SS to recover from a foot injury and prepare for the BWF World Championships. In World Championships in August, she was seeded fourth. She reached the quarterfinals of this tournament for the first time, where she defeated Carolina Marín in a very hard-fought encounter. Her semifinal path was relatively easy, where she won against P. V. Sindhu in two games. In the final, she won the title, beating world number 1 and Olympic gold medalist Li Xuerui 22–20, 18–21, 21–14. She was the first-ever Thai player to be the World Champion and was also the youngest singles World Champion ever at the age of 18. She became the world champion while still being eligible to play in the World Junior Championships that year. After the World Championships, she injured her back and failed to qualify for the Super Series Finals, finishing the year as the world number three. She was awarded the "2013 Best Females Athletes Award" from the Thailand Sports Authority.

2014 
In 2014, Intanon reached the final of the Korea Open for the first time, meeting Wang Yihan and continuing her losing streak against Wang. She was awarded "Best Asian Sporting Icon" by Fox Sports Asia, based on voting from internet fans on its website. She reached the finals of the Indonesia Open but lost to Li Xuerui. She failed to defend her World Championships title after losing in the third round to Minatsu Mitani. She was defeated by Bae Yeon-ju in the quarterfinals of the 2014 Asian Games. She qualified for the Super Series Finals in Dubai but failed to pass the round-robin stage after losing group matches against Tai Tzu-ying and Akane Yamaguchi. She finished the 2014 year as world number 6.

2015 
In 2015, Intanon made a comeback by reaching the final of the India Open for the second time but lost to her opponent Saina Nehwal. A month later, she became the first Thai singles player to win the Asia Championships by defeating Li Xuerui in the final 20–22, 23–21, 21–12 in China. It was the first time that Intanon had beaten Li since the final of the 2013 World Championships. In June, she won her first Super Series Premier title by beating Yui Hashimoto of Japan in straight games at the Indonesia Open. However, at the BWF World Championships, she had to retire from court when 8–5 up in the decider against Lindaweni Fanetri in the round of 16 from cramps.

She won a gold medal with the Thailand women's team at the 2015 Southeast Asian Games in Singapore. After the Indonesia Open, she did not reach the final of any tournaments but earned enough points to qualify for the Dubai Super Series Finals. In the group stage, she lost to Wang Yihan, but won two other matches against Wang Shixian and Sung Ji-hyun, progressing to the semifinals. She lost to Wang Yihan there, which brought their head-to-head record to 0–12. She finished the 2015 season at world number seven.

2016 
In 2016, Intanon won the Thailand Masters, a second Grand Prix Gold tournament in Thailand, by beating Sun Yu in the final. She won the India Open for the second time by beating Li Xuerui in the final. In the Malaysia Open the week after, she defeated Wang Yihan for the first time by beating her in the semifinal. In the final, she beat Tai Tzu-ying to earn the Malaysia Open title for the first time. This was the first time she had won two consecutive Superseries tournaments; Intanon then became the first singles player to win three Superseries in three consecutive weeks by winning the Singapore Super Series, defeating Sun Yu in the final. By winning three Superseries in a row, Intanon also rose to the number 1 spot in the world rankings, becoming the first Thai to achieve this feat. Her winning streak ended after she lost to Sayaka Sato in the Asian Championships.

Intanon qualified for the 2016 Summer Olympics and was the Thai flag bearer. At the Olympics she failed to pass the round of 16, losing to Akane Yamaguchi, in two games: 19–21, 16–21. After the Olympics, she suffered a knee injury which forced her to retire from subsequent tournaments. In the Super Series Finals, Intanon lost in straight games to Sung Ji-hyun and Tai Tzu-ying, and retired injured against He Bingjiao. She finished 2016 at a world ranking of five.

2017 
She played in her first tournament of 2017 in March, the |All England Open. She made her way to the quarter-finals, where she faced off against world no. 2 Carolina Marín. Intanon won after being down 11–18 in the rubber set but won 10 straight points to close out the match. After defeating Akane Yamaguchi in the semifinals, Intanon was defeated by Tai Tzu-ying 16–21, 20–22.

Intanon later in the year took the Thailand Open title, beating compatriot Busanan Ongbamrungphan in the final. She also won the New Zealand Open beating Saena Kawakami. She was disappointed in the World Championships when she lost to Chen Yufei in the quarterfinal. After defeating Sung Ji-hyun and Tai Tzu-ying in the Denmark Open Premier Series, Intanon beat Akane Yamaguchi in the final in three games after being 16–19 down in the final game; she won the game 21–19. She said that she dedicated the title to Thailand's king, Bhumibol Adulyadej, who had died the year before. She qualified for the season-ending Superseries Finals, where she defeated Sung Ji-hyun and Tai Tzu-ying and lost the third group match to Chen Yufei. She was defeated in the semi-finals by Akane Yamaguchi in three games after she was leading in the final game.

2018 
At the beginning of the year, Intanon won the Malaysia Masters Super 500, beating Tai Tzu-ying in the finals, winning 24–22 in the third set. In the World Championships, she lost to Saina Nehwal in the third round. At the Asian Games, Intanon made it to the quarter-final stage before losing out to Nehwal. She made the finals of the Hong Kong Open, losing to Nozomi Okuhara. She qualified for the BWF World Tour Finals, where she ended her losing streak against Chen Yufei. She lost to Nozomi Okuhara but defeated Canada's Michelle Li to secure a semifinal spot. She lost in the semifinals to eventual gold medalist P. V. Sindhu. She finished the year at world no. 8.

2019–20 

In 2019, Intanon won the Malaysia Masters Super 500, defending her title by winning in straight games for all her matches, including the final where she beat Carolina Marín. At the final of German Open Super 300, she lost to Akane Yamaguchi in three games, losing 23–25 in the deciding game. She then won her third India Open title by beating He Bingjiao. This was Intanon's first victory over her. She lost the final of Thailand Open to Chen Yufei in two games. She won the bronze medal at Basel World Championship after losing to Nozomi Okuhara in the semifinals. Intanon was one point away from winning the Korea Open against He Bingjiao, but she saved four match points and won the next game.

Intanon failed an out-of-competition drug test in April but was not banned by the BWF. The BWF statement reads: "The ethics hearing panel determined Ms. Ratchanok Intanon committed an anti-doping rule violation, but as the athlete was able to demonstrate that her adverse analytical finding was related to the ingestion of meat contaminated with clenbuterol, she was found to bear no fault or negligence for the violation, and thus no period of ineligibility has been imposed on her." She lost again to Chen Yufei in the final of the Hong Kong Open. She participated in the World Tour Finals, where she beat Busanan Ongbamrungphan, lost to Tai Tzu-ying, and lost to Nozomi Okuhara in the last group match. Intanon's first title of 2020 came when she won the Indonesia Masters title by beating Carolina Marín in three game.

Records currently held 
 Youngest ever singles champion at the BWF World Championships (2013, age of 18 years, 6 months and 6 days).
 Youngest ever champion of the BWF World Junior Championships (2009, age of 14).
 First ever three-time champion in a single discipline of the BWF World Junior Championships (2009, 2010, 2011).
 Youngest ever singles finalist of the All England Open Badminton Championships (2013, age of 18).
 First ever singles player to win three Superseries titles in three consecutive weeks.
 First ever Thai badminton player ranked world number 1.

Achievements

BWF World Championships 
Women's singles

Asian Championships 
Women's singles

Southeast Asian Games 
Women's singles

BWF World Junior Championships 
Girls' singles

Asian Junior Championships 
Girls' doubles

BWF World Tour (5 titles, 7 runners-up) 
The BWF World Tour, which was announced on 19 March 2017 and implemented in 2018, is a series of elite badminton tournaments sanctioned by the Badminton World Federation (BWF). The BWF World Tour is divided into levels of World Tour Finals, Super 1000, Super 750, Super 500, Super 300, and the BWF Tour Super 100.

Women's singles

BWF Superseries (6 titles, 6 runners-up) 
The BWF Superseries, which was launched on 14 December 2006 and implemented in 2007, was a series of elite badminton tournaments, sanctioned by the Badminton World Federation (BWF). BWF Superseries levels were Superseries and Superseries Premier. A season of Superseries consisted of twelve tournaments around the world that had been introduced since 2011. Successful players were invited to the Superseries Finals, which were held at the end of each year.

Women's singles

  BWF Superseries Premier tournament
  BWF Superseries tournament

BWF Grand Prix (7 titles, 3 runners-up) 
The BWF Grand Prix had two levels, the Grand Prix and Grand Prix Gold. It was a series of badminton tournaments sanctioned by the Badminton World Federation (BWF) and played between 2007 and 2017.

Women's singles

  BWF Grand Prix Gold tournament
  BWF Grand Prix tournament

BWF International Challenge/Series (2 titles, 4 runners-up) 
Women's singles

Women's doubles

Mixed doubles

  BWF International Challenge tournament
  BWF International Series tournament
  BWF Future Series tournament

Personal life 
Intanon is the daughter of Winutchai Intanon and Kumpan Suvarsara. She also has a brother. She is half-blooded from the provinces of Roi Et and Yasothon. Her father is a native of Yasothon and her mother is a native of Roi Et. She was born in Yasothon Province in the northeast of Thailand, but moved at the age of three months with her parents, who worked at the Banthongyord sweets factory in the Bang Khae District of Bangkok. As a child,  she would run around the factory floor. Factory owner Kamala Thongkorn, worried that she would be burned by boiling water and hot sugar, allowed Intanon to play at the factory's badminton courts. She started playing when she was six years old, and won her first championship at the age of seven.

Intanon used her prize money and endorsement fees to aid her parents and brother. Her father opened a food shop with her help. "I wanted to be a national player like my older friends and play for the country, because that was the only way I could help my parents to improve our status and leave poverty," she has said.

Intanon trains at the Banthongyord Badminton School. Her coach is Patapol Ngernsrisuk, former Olympian and son of Kamala Thongkorn.

Career statistics 
Singles

Doubles

Prize money

Statistics were last updated on 24 March 2021.

 Performance timeline 

 National team 
 Junior level Senior level Individual competitions 
 Junior level 
 Girls' singles Girls' doubles Mixed doubles Senior level 
 Women singles''

Record against selected opponents 
Record against Year-end Finals finalists, World Championships semifinalists, and Olympic quarterfinalists. Accurate as of 20 December 2022.

Royal decorations 
 2012 –  Member (Fifth Class) of The Most Admirable Order of the Direkgunabhorn
 2013 –  Commander (Third Class) of The Most Admirable Order of the Direkgunabhorn
 2016 –  Dame Commander (Second Class) of The Most Admirable Order of the Direkgunabhorn

Honors and awards 
Intanon has won many awards and honors in recognition of her achievements.

References

External links 

 
 
 Ratchanok Intanon at BadmintonLink.com

1995 births
Living people
Ratchanok Intanon
Ratchanok Intanon
Badminton players at the 2012 Summer Olympics
Badminton players at the 2016 Summer Olympics
Ratchanok Intanon
Badminton players at the 2010 Asian Games
Badminton players at the 2014 Asian Games
Badminton players at the 2018 Asian Games
Ratchanok Intanon
Ratchanok Intanon
Asian Games medalists in badminton
Medalists at the 2010 Asian Games
Medalists at the 2018 Asian Games
Competitors at the 2009 Southeast Asian Games
Competitors at the 2011 Southeast Asian Games
Competitors at the 2015 Southeast Asian Games
Competitors at the 2019 Southeast Asian Games
Ratchanok Intanon
Ratchanok Intanon
Ratchanok Intanon
Southeast Asian Games medalists in badminton
World No. 1 badminton players
Thai autobiographers
Women autobiographers
Badminton players at the 2020 Summer Olympics